The Scout and Guide movement in the Dominican Republic is served by two organisations:
 Asociación de Guías Scouts Dominicanas, member of the World Association of Girl Guides and Girl Scouts
 Asociación de Scouts Dominicanos, member of the World Organization of the Scout Movement

International Scouting units in the Dominican Republic
In addition, there are American Boy Scouts in Santo Domingo, linked to the Direct Service branch of the Boy Scouts of America, which supports units around the world.

See also